was a town located in Ōtsu District, Yamaguchi Prefecture, Japan.

As of 2003, the town had an estimated population of 7,857 and a density of 84.24 persons per km². The total area was 93.27 km².

On March 22, 2005, Yuya, along with the towns of Heki and Misumi (all from Ōtsu District), was merged into the expanded city of Nagato.

External links
 Nagato official website 

Dissolved municipalities of Yamaguchi Prefecture